Navaniat Singh is an Indian film director who works in Punjabi and Hindi cinema. He is known for directing the Punjabi films Mel Karade Rabba (2010), Dharti (2011), Singh vs. Kaur (2013) and Rangeelay (2013).

Filmography

References 

Living people
Punjabi-language film directors
Year of birth missing (living people)
Indian film directors
21st-century Indian film directors